Dayle is the name of:

 Dayle Coleing (born 1996), Gibraltarian professional footballer
 Dayle Friedman, American rabbi
 Dayle Grubb (born 1991), English professional footballer
 Dayle Haddon (born 1948), model and actress, promoter of L'Oréal anti-aging products
 Dayle Hadlee (born 1948), former New Zealand cricketer
 Dayle Hammock, South Dakota politician
 Dayle Hinman (born 1952), retired FBI-trained criminal profiler
 Dayle Shackel (born 1970), New Zealand former cricketer
 Dayle Southwell (born 1993), English professional footballer